Trusov is a Russian masculine surname, its feminine counterpart is Trusova. It may refer to
Alexandra Trusova (born 2004), Russian figure skater
Anastasia Trusova, Russian model and beauty pageant 
Nikolay Trusov (born 1985), Russian racing cyclist
Pyotr Trusov (born 1948), Russian physicist

Russian-language surnames